The S20 district lies within in the City of Sheffield, South Yorkshire, England.  The district contains 22 listed buildings that are recorded in the National Heritage List for England.  Of these, one is listed at Grade II*, the middle grade, and the others are at Grade II, the lowest grade.  The district is in the south east of the city of Sheffield, and covers the areas of Beighton, Crystal Peaks, Halfway, Mosborough, Owlthorpe, Sothall, Waterthorpe and Westfield.

For neighbouring areas, see listed buildings in S12, listed buildings in S13, listed buildings in Aston cum Aughton, listed buildings in Eckington, Derbyshire, listed buildings in Killamarsh, and listed buildings in Wales, South Yorkshire.


Key

Buildings

References 

 - A list of all the listed buildings within Sheffield City Council's boundary is available to download from this page.

Sources

 S20
Sheffield S20